The Institute of Mathematical Sciences (IMSc) (sometimes also referred to as Matscience) is a research centre located in Chennai, India.

IMSc is a national institute for fundamental research in frontier disciplines of the mathematical and physical sciences: theoretical computer science, mathematics, theoretical physics, and computational biology. It is funded mainly by the Department of Atomic Energy. The institute operates the Kabru supercomputer.

History
The institute was founded by Alladi Ramakrishnan in 1962. It is modelled after the Institute for Advanced Study, Princeton, New Jersey, United States. It went through a phase of expansion when E. C. G. Sudarshan in the 1980s and R. Ramachandran in 1990s were the directors.  The current director of the institute is V.Ravindran.

Academics
The institute has a graduate research program to which a group of students are admitted each year to work towards a Ph.D. degree. IMSc hosts scientists at the post-doctoral level and supports a visiting scientist program in areas of research in the institute.

Campus

Located in South Chennai, in the Adyar-Taramani area, the institute is on the Central Institutes of Technology (CIT) campus. The institute maintains a student hostel, flatlets for long-term visitors, married students and post-doctoral fellows, and the institute guest house. IMSc has its own faculty housing in Tiruvanmiyur near the seashore.

Notable people 

 Ramachandran Balasubramanian, mathematician
 Ganapathy Baskaran, physicist
 Indumathi D., physicist
 Rajiah Simon, physicist
 Radha Balakrishnan, physicist

References

External links 
Official website

Universities and colleges in Chennai
Mathematical institutes
Homi Bhabha National Institute
Research institutes in Chennai
Mathematics education in India
Academic institutions formerly affiliated with the University of Madras
Research institutes in Tamil Nadu
Research institutes established in 1962
Educational institutions established in 1962
1962 establishments in Madras State